PJT Partners, Inc. is a global advisory-focused investment bank, founded in October 2015 as part of The Blackstone Group's spin-off of its financial and strategic advisory services businesses. The firm was founded by Paul J Taubman after his 30-year tenure at Morgan Stanley, where he served as Global Head of Mergers and Acquisitions, Global Head of Investment Banking and until the end of 2012, Co-President of the Institutional Securities Group, which included Investment Banking as well as Sales and Trading.

PJT operates leading businesses across Strategic Advisory, Strategic Capital Markets, Restructuring, Shareholder Advisory and Capital Raising. The firm has advised on over $600bn+ in M&A transactions in its short history, including AbbVie's $63bn acquisition of Allergan, T-Mobile's $59 Billion Merger with Sprint and Mylan's $50 Billion Combination with Upjohn, a Division of Pfizer.  

The firm is headquartered in New York City, with additional offices in Boston, Chicago, Hong Kong, Houston, London, Los Angeles, Madrid, San Francisco and Sydney, and employs approximately 700 people.

History and background
In 2015, PJT Partners, Inc. was created from a merger of the advisory arm of The Blackstone Group (which had operated for thirty years) and PJT Capital LP, a strategic advisory firm founded by Paul Jefferey Taubman in 2013. PJT Partners' first day of trading was on October 1, 2015; on the same day, it became publicly traded, listing on the New York Stock Exchange (NYSE) under the symbol PJT. On its first day of trading, PJT had 330 employees and 46 partners.

Blackstone’s decision to do the spin-off was largely driven by the conflicts of interest that arose between Blackstone’s advisory services business and its investing businesses, including private equity, real estate investing and hedge funds.

In 2020, PJT achieved record revenue of $1.05 billion, more than double the revenue achieved five years prior. In 2020, the firm was rated "No. 3 Best Banking Firms for Business Outlook" by Vault. The firm is routinely cited as one of the best paying firm's in the industry where average pay per head is ~$750,000 and has the highest pay for first year analysts. 

Each year, the firm hires about 20 analysts.

Leadership
Paul J. Taubman has served as the chairman and chief executive of PJT Partners since its inception in 2015, and was the founder of its predecessor firm, PJT Capital LP, in 2013. He previously spent approximately 30 years at Morgan Stanley, where he was Co-President of Institutional Securities. Bloomberg News reported that Taubman was the second-highest-paid U.S. executive of 2015 (after Patrick Soon-Shiong), earning $164 million in awarded pay.

In 2015, before the firm began operations, Taubman hired a number of senior European bankers to lead PJT Partners' European operation. Soon after the firm was founded, former NBA Commissioner David J. Stern joined the firm as a senior adviser.

Business and competitors
The firm is organized across three business lines: Strategic Advisory handles M&A, capital markets advisory, spin-offs, private placements, structured products and other transactions. Restructuring & Special Situations handles debtor advisory, creditor advisory, out-of-court solutions, distressed M&A and expert witness testimony. The Park Hill Group provides services for private equity, real estate, hedge funds and secondary advisory services. In 2018, PJT acquired CamberView, which advises clients on all aspects of corporate governance and shareholder activism, including contested situations, for $165 million.  CamberView has since re-branded as PJT Camberview.

The firm's restructuring and special situations team offers services that include advising companies, governments, creditors, and financial sponsors on distressed M&A, recapitalizations, reorganizations, exchange offers, debt repurchases and capital raises across industries such as automotive, consumer products, energy, financial institutions, healthcare, real estate, gaming & leisure, manufacturing, media & communications, retail, shipping, steel and transportation. The firm's restructuring business has completed over $1.9 trillion worth of deals since inception and was ranked #1 globally and in the U.S. for both announced and completed restructuring deals for the first quarter of 2016. Notable restructuring and special situations clients include Ford, General Motors, Goodyear, BCBGMAXAZRIA, Chiquita, Kodak, Hostess Brands, Mrs. Fields' Original Cookies, Xerox, Arch Coal, CHC Helicopter, TXU Energy, Enron, Evergreen Solar, General Electric, Key Energy, Linn Energy, Odebrecht, Penn Virginia, Samson Resources, Walter Energy, American International Group (AIG), Bear Stearns, Kaupthing, Lehman Brothers, Four Seasons Health Care, Vencor, Bally, Los Angeles Dodgers, Six Flags, Cengage, Dow Corning, Molycorp, Noranda Aluminum, Verso Corporation, AT&T Canada, Comcast, Avaya, iHeartMedia, Motorola, NII Holdings, Nortel, Tribune Media, Vivacom, Detroit, Dubai World, Greece, Iceland, Kansas, Puerto Rico, Ukraine, Caesars Entertainment Corporation, Kerzner International Resorts, Barneys New York, Macy's, Inc., Jack Wolfskin, J. C. Penney, Sears, Quiksilver, Sports Authority, Ultrapetrol, Aeroméxico, American Airlines, Delta Air Lines, Gol Transportes Aéreos, Kenya Airways.

The firm competes with all investment banks that provide strategic advisory services. Main competitors include other leading independent advisory firms such as Centerview, Evercore and Lazard.

References

External links 

 Official Website
 PJT Partners London Stock Exchange

Investment banks in the United States
American companies established in 2015
Financial services companies established in 2015
Banks established in 2015
Companies listed on the New York Stock Exchange